Mucoserous acini (singular acinus) or mixed acini are mainly present in submandibular and sublingual glands. They are formed by mucous cells with some serous cells interspersed each other. Both cells pour their secretion directly in the lumen. Layer of mucous cells and serous demilune of serous cells superficial to mucous cells

Histology